The Chicago Stock Exchange Arch is one of the few surviving fragments from the Chicago Stock Exchange building designed in 1893, installed outside the Art Institute of Chicago, in the U.S. state of Illinois. The arch was sculpted by Dankmar Adler & Louis Sullivan in 1893 and was preserved when the building was demolished in 1972. It was installed outside the Art Institute of Chicago in 1977.

See also

 List of public art in Chicago

References

External links
 

1893 sculptures
Outdoor sculptures in Chicago
Sculptures of the Art Institute of Chicago